Glebe Creek is a stream in Talbot County, Maryland, in the United States.

Glebe Creek derives its name from the glebe which owned it in Colonial Maryland.

See also
List of rivers of Maryland

References

Rivers of Talbot County, Maryland
Rivers of Maryland